Jacklyn Anne Trad (born 25 April 1972) is a former Australian politician. She was Deputy Premier of Queensland from 2015 to 2020, Treasurer of Queensland from 2017 to 2020 and represented the Electoral district of South Brisbane for the Labor Party from April 2012 to October 2020.

Trad also served as Queensland's Minister for Transport, Minister for Trade, Minister for Infrastructure, Local Government and Planning, and Minister for Aboriginal and Torres Strait Islander Partnerships in the Palaszczuk Government.

Personal life and family
Trad is the second daughter of Lebanese immigrants; Lebanese Arabic was her first language. The family returned to Lebanon in 1979 to live in Beirut for one year where she attended the International College. Back in Australia, she attended Lourdes Hill College in Brisbane and her parents became local small business owners, operating a fruit shop in Woolloongabba. She began an arts degree at Griffith University and completed a Master of Public Policy at the University of Sydney.

She grew up in South Brisbane and currently lives in the suburb of West End with her husband and two children.

Trad identifies as Catholic and with her Maronite Church heritage.

Political career

Trad was elected to the legislature at the South Brisbane by-election held on 28 April 2012. The by-election was held after the resignation of the previous Labor Party incumbent and former Premier Anna Bligh.

Trad has also held several positions within the structure of the Australian Labor Party (ALP). She was formerly the Queensland ALP Assistant State Secretary, President of the Kurilpa Branch, a delegate to the ALP National and State Conferences, member of the National Executive Committee and also the Secretary of Labor Women's Organisation Queensland. She is the current leader of Queensland Labor's Left Faction.

Trad is on the record as being a supporter of same-sex marriage. She is also a supporter of adoption by same-sex partners.

Opposition
On 29 April 2012, Opposition Leader Annastacia Palaszczuk appointed Trad as Shadow Minister for Transport and Main Roads, Environment and Heritage Protection, Small Business, Consumer Affairs and the Arts.

Trad was appointed as a member of the Parliamentary Ethics Committee and Parliamentary Crime and Misconduct Committee respectively, and served from May 2012 to January 2015.

On 11 September 2012, Leader of the House Ray Stevens referred to Trad as "Jihad Jackie" during parliamentary debate. Believing the term to be referring to her Lebanese heritage, Ms Trad objected and requested that the remark be withdrawn. Immediately following this interaction, Premier Campbell Newman said that Jackie Trad was "precious" and needed to "harden up." Trad commented outside parliament that "It is outrageous to think that the Queensland Parliament should be condoning these sorts of racist barbs when they are unacceptable in the community." Her comments were echoed by Ethnic Communities Council executive manager Ian Muil when he said Mr Stevens' comment would upset people, especially in the Muslim community, describing it as "dog-whistle type stuff."

First Palaszczuk Ministry
Following the Queensland state election on 31 January 2015, Tim Mulherin stood down as deputy leader, and Trad was named his successor.  She thus became Deputy Premier of Queensland in the Palaszczuk Ministry on 14 February 2015.

In addition to being sworn in as the Deputy Premier, Trad became the Minister for Infrastructure, Local Government and Planning, Minister for Transport and Minister for Trade. Following changes to the Palaszczuk Ministry in December 2015, which included expanding its size from 14 to 17, the transport portfolio was transferred to new minister Stirling Hinchliffe. Following Mr Hinchliffe's resignation as Minister for Transport in February 2017, Trad regained the portfolio and held it until the Second Palaszczuk Ministry was sworn in on 12 December 2017.

Tree clearing laws
On 17 March 2016, Trad introduced the Vegetation Management (Reinstatement) Amendment Bill into parliament, the Palaszczuk Government's bill intended to reverse the previous government's repeal of the Wild Rivers Legislation, enacted in 2005 in an attempt to preserve native vegetation. The changes in legislation under the Newman Government in 2013 had allowed increased rates of tree-clearing in Queensland. The Statewide Landcover and Tree Study (SLATS) report showed 296,324 hectares was cleared in 2013–14, a threefold increase on 2009–10 and the highest level since 2006. The 2014–15 Report found that a further 207,000 hectares was cleared. Trad called the proposed legislation "nation-leading" and one of the Palaszczuk Government's key commitments for protecting the Great Barrier Reef. Despite widespread public campaigning by conservation groups, the bill failed to pass the Legislative Assembly with a vote of 42 in favour and 44 against. It was the first time the Palaszczuk Government had failed to get one of its own bills through parliament. Ms Trad announced in October 2016 that Labor would re-introduce the legislation if it won the next election. Following their victory at the 2017 Election, Labor re-introduced the bill as the Vegetation Management and Other
Legislation Amendment Bill 2018 and it passed on 9 May 2018.

Abortion reform

On 10 May 2016, Independent former-Labor MP Rob Pyne introduced two pieces of legislation to the Legislative Assembly aimed at decriminalising abortion in Queensland. Trad became the first government MP to support the bill and described herself as “unashamedly pro-choice”. She said it was time for Queensland law “to catch up with legal precedent and treat pregnancy termination as a health issue, not a criminal issue.” Her public statements in support of abortion law reform prompted Brisbane Catholic Archbishop Mark Coleridge to offer to "counsel" her and her Labor colleagues. At a rally in opposition to Mr Pyne's bills, Archbishop Coleridge also likened the practice of abortion to Nazi Germany. Ms Trad responded: "I would have thought the archbishop had more important things to focus on, like the inquiry into institutional abuse and the findings that are coming out of that inquiry than what is before the Queensland parliament," a reference to the Royal Commission into Institutional Responses to Child Sexual Abuse. Following the decision by the LNP to vote against the bills, Mr Pyne withdrew them both in February 2017.

The Palaszczuk Government referred the issue to the Queensland Law Reform Commission and pledged to introduce its own bill to decriminalise abortion in the next term of parliament. The Termination of Pregnancy Bill 2018 was introduced to the Queensland Parliament on 22 August 2018, and passed on 25 October the same year.

Planning reform
On November 12, 2015, Trad introduced 3 government bills into the Legislative Assembly aimed at reforming the infrastructure and planning framework in Queensland, including what would become the Planning Act 2016. The new Planning Act made several changes to planning rules in the state including introducing 'bounded' code assessment that ensures proposed developments are more strictly assessed against the planning code, independent examination of proposed developments that may impact heritage buildings, a requirement for local government to publish reasons for development decisions for the first time, providing the ability for local governments to increase infrastructure charges to deliver community infrastructure, and affording residents and community groups the ability to appeal development decisions without adverse cost orders being awarded against them.

Local Government electoral reform
On 1 December 2016, Trad introduced the Local Government Electoral (Transparency and Accountability in Local Government) and Other Legislation Amendment Bill into Queensland Parliament. The bill was passed into law on 10 May 2017, and amended a number of existing laws, most notably the Local Government Electoral Act 2011.

The Crime and Corruption Commission’s December 2015 report regarding transparency and accountability in local government was noted as a major catalyst for the bill’s introduction. A number of reforms to local government elections resulted, including ‘real-time’ political donation disclosures (in line with reforms to state elections introduced by the Palaszczuk Government), setting the candidate and third-party election disclosure donation threshold at $500 to align with a councillor's register of interest gift disclosures threshold, and a requirement that all unspent campaign donations are either to be held for future campaign expenditure, returned to the relevant political party or transferred to a registered charity.

Second Palaszczuk Ministry
On 12 December 2017, Trad was sworn in as Deputy Premier, Treasurer and Minister for Aboriginal and Torres Strait Islander Partnerships in the Second Palaszczuk Ministry.

First Budget
Trad delivered her first budget as Queensland Treasurer in June 2018, for the 2018–19 financial year. Official budget papers unveiled a $1.512 billion surplus in 2017–18 – more than three times the forecast in the Mid Year Fiscal and Economic Review in December 2017. The 2018–19 budget also forecast operating surpluses for the next four years. The increase in forecast surpluses meant general government sector debt in 2017–18 was approximately $2.4 billion less than estimated in the 2017–18 budget. However, government debt was forecast to increase from a total of $70.8 billion in 2018/19 to $83 billion in 2021–22.

The Budget included $50 million in 2018–19 as a capital grant to support the development of concentrated solar thermal projects to provide clean baseload power, and included additional funding over three years for solar and energy efficiency measures through the $97 million Advancing Clean Energy Schools program.

Mining Rehabilitation Reforms
Trad introduced the Mineral and Energy Resources (Financial Provisioning) Bill on 15 February 2018, and was passed in November the same year. 
The MERFP Act aims to ensure that land disturbed by mining activities is rehabilitated to a safe and stable landform that does not cause environmental harm, and can sustain an approved post-mining land use through requiring mining companies to develop Progressive Rehabilitation and Closure Plans. The Progressive Rehabilitation and Closure Plan requirements commenced on 1 November 2019 and have been integrated into the existing environmental authority processes for new mines.

Second Budget
Trad's second budget as Queensland Treasurer was delivered in June 2019 for the 2019–20 financial year. A significant expenditure unveiled by the budget was the allocation of $250 million to CleanCo, a recently established government-owned clean energy generator operating and growing a portfolio of low and zero emission electricity generation assets to help Queensland achieve its 50 per cent renewable energy target. The budget also included a $330 million five-year allocation for the Great Barrier Reef including to the Joint Field Management Program for reef protection measures implemented by the Great Barrier Reef Marine Park Authority and the Queensland Parks and Wildlife Service.

Questions over investment property 
Queensland Premier Annastacia Palaszczuk removed Trad from all dealings with Brisbane's Cross River Rail project in the wake of controversy that emerged surrounding an investment property. The property was purchased by Trad's family trust in the Brisbane suburb of Woolloongabba for $695,000 in March 2019. The location was within proximity of the proposed Boggo Road station in the $5.4 billion Cross River Rail Project for which Trad had ministerial responsibility. Trad was subsequently referred to the Crime and Corruption Commission (CCC) by Opposition Leader Deb Frecklington. The chair of the commission recused himself from the investigation after questions about a call he received from Trad, which both parties described as a courtesy call.

In September 2019, the commission announced it would not investigate Trad, stating that they saw no evidence that supported a reasonable suspicion of corrupt conduct. The commission did make several recommendations about rule changes and legislation to lower corruption risks.

Resignation and CCC investigation
On 9 May 2020, the Crime and Corruption Commission launched an investigation into Trad's potential misuse of power in the selection of a principal of a newly constructed school in her electorate. On the same day, she announced she would stand down from all her ministerial positions (including Deputy Premier and Treasurer) until the conclusion of the CCC's investigation. Health minister Steven Miles would become Deputy Premier, while Cameron Dick would become Treasurer. She formally resigned from the positions the following day.

The CCC investigation cleared Trad in July that year, stating that "there is no prima facie case that the Deputy Premier has committed a criminal offence or that she was motivated by any dishonest or corrupt intent". However, it also stated that the way in which the Department of Education had handled the recruitment exercise had created a corruption risk.

Trad later said to reporters that she felt vindicated by the CCC's findings, and that referrals by the LNP opposition to the corruption watchdog were politically motivated.

2020 Queensland state election
Trad approached the 2020 election under significant pressure. The combination of a marginal seat targeted by the Greens and the LNP's decision to preference Greens above Labor sparked speculation that Trad could lose her seat to second-time Greens challenger Amy MacMahon. Trad herself declared that she was in 'the fight of her political life.' A Newspoll for the electorate of South Brisbane in late October found that the Greens would win the seat on a 54.5% two-party-preferred vote.

On election night, ABC psephologist Antony Green called the South Brisbane seat for the Greens candidate. Despite only a small swing away from her primary vote, Trad slipped from first position to second and subsequently suffered an 8.90% two candidate preferred swing following the distribution of LNP preferences.

See also
 First Palaszczuk Ministry
 Second Palaszczuk Ministry
 2015 Queensland state election
 2017 Queensland state election
 2020 Queensland state election

References

External links
Member Biography: Ms Jackie Trad, Queensland Parliament

1972 births
Living people
Deputy Premiers of Queensland
Members of the Queensland Legislative Assembly
Labor Left politicians
University of Sydney alumni
Griffith University alumni
Australian people of Lebanese descent
People from Brisbane
Australian Labor Party members of the Parliament of Queensland
21st-century Australian politicians
Women members of the Queensland Legislative Assembly
21st-century Australian women politicians